KVCB may refer to:

 KVCB-LP, a low-power radio station (100.9 FM) licensed to serve Vacaville, California, United States
 Nut Tree Airport (ICAO code KVCB)